The American Youth Philharmonic Orchestras (AYPO) is group of youth orchestras in the Washington metropolitan area. The group consists of three full orchestras (the American Youth Philharmonic, Symphonic Orchestra, and Concert Orchestra), and three string orchestras (Sinfonietta, String Ensemble, and Debut Orchestra), along with several chamber ensembles and community outreach organizations. Currently, over 430 young musicians take part in AYPO programs.

History 
The orchestras were founded as the youth division of the Fairfax Symphony in 1965 with a single ensemble, the Northern Virginia Youth Symphony. The orchestra became independent of the Fairfax Symphony in 1978, and in 1993 changed the name of its main ensemble to the American Youth Philharmonic. The organization has steadily grown since its founding, with the most recent constituent orchestra, the Sinfonietta, being founded in 2021. The organization is among the most prominent in the Washington metropolitan area, performing at a number of prominent venues including Carnegie Hall and the Kennedy Center. In the past, it has also toured internationally to participate in programs such as the Aberdeen International Youth Festival. AYPO also conducts an outreach program to under-served students in Alexandria City Public Schools, called Music Buddies.

Currently, the organization is led by the British organist and choirmaster Dr. Graham Elliott. AYPO's board of directors is mostly composed of the parents of young musicians in AYPO, including business figures such as Ben Baldanza.

References

External links
AYPO official website

American youth orchestras
Performing arts in Virginia